Hans Potthof (January 24, 1911 – March 29, 2003) was a Swiss painter as well as a sprint canoeist who competed in the late 1930s.

Potthof completed in the K-1 1000 m event at the 1936 Summer Olympics, but was eliminated in the heats.

He later was a painter and graphic artist; he painted landscapes and figures, and created drawings, lithographs, murals, mosaics and stained glass. His mural on the Katastrophenbucht, created in the 1970s, was remarkable: the painting existed until 1998.

External links
Hans Potthof's profile at Sports Reference.com

References 

1911 births
2003 deaths
20th-century Swiss painters
Swiss male painters
Canoeists at the 1936 Summer Olympics
Olympic canoeists of Switzerland
Swiss male canoeists
20th-century Swiss male artists